Douwe de Vries (born 14 June 1982) is a Dutch former professional marathon speed skater and long track speed skater. He resides in Heerenveen, Friesland. Douwe de Vries, who was a member of the commercial team of LottoNL-Jumbo, is the current holder (with Sven Kramer and Marcel Bosker) of the team pursuit world record.

Career
In 2007, Douwe de Vries won the Willem Poelstra Trophy for the greatest talent in marathon skating.

On 6 December 2014, he finished third at the 2014–15 ISU Speed Skating World Cup – World Cup 3 – Men's 5000 metres.

In 2015 and 2016, he won the gold medal in the team pursuit event at the World Single Distance Championships.

In March 2015, Douwe de Vries improved the world hour record, set by Casper Helling on 15 March 2007 at 41,969.10 m, bringing it to 42,252.22 m.

He has a score of 146.604 points on the adelskalender.

Records

Personal records

World records

Tournament overview

DQ = Disqualified
NC = No classification
DNQ = Did not qualify for the final distance
DNS =Did not start
Source:

World Cup overview

– = Did not participate
DNF = Did not finish
(b) = Division B
* = 10000 meter

Medals won

References

External links

1982 births
Living people
Sportspeople from Heerenveen
Dutch male speed skaters
World Single Distances Speed Skating Championships medalists
21st-century Dutch people